The Double McGuffin is a 1979 American mystery film written and directed by Joe Camp. The film stars Ernest Borgnine and George Kennedy.

Elke Sommer and NFL stars Ed 'Too Tall' Jones and Lyle Alzado also appear in smaller roles. The film also included a young Vincent Spano as well as Dion Pride (son of country singer Charley Pride). An opening narration is provided by Orson Welles. The cast included Chicago native Michael Gerard, and Dallas area child actors Greg Hodges and Jeff Nicholson.

Film title
At the beginning of the film, the narrator, Orson Welles, informs the audience that a McGuffin is an object that serves as the focal point of a plot and this film has two.

Plot
A group of boarding school students discover, in succession, a suitcase full of money, a dead body, and a dismembered hand. They are unable to convince the local police to take them seriously, because they have not secured any evidence and because the police chief (played by Kennedy) is suspicious of them due to their past misbehavior. They follow the evidence themselves and realize that a political assassination is planned at a school event. They foil the plot themselves.

Cast
 Dion Pride as Specks
 Greg Hodges as Homer Rutledge
 Jeff Nicholson as Billy Ray Dober
 Vincent Spano as Foster Amaway
 Lisa Whelchel as Jody
 Michael Gerard as Arthur Honneycutt
 Elke Sommer as Madame Kura
 Lori Lively as Michelle Carter
 George Kennedy as Chief Arnold Talasek
 Ernest Borgnine as Mr. Firat
 Garvin Edwards as Football Player
 Anne Reilly as Cocktail Waitress
 Rod Browning as Moras
 Ed "Too Tall" Jones as Assassin #1
 Lyle Alzado as Assassin #2
 Mike Davis as Newlywed #1
 Peggy Davis as Newlywed #2
 Kit Lyons as Computer Programmer
 George Bailey as Night Watchman
 Ben Mayo as Taxi Driver
 Cyrus Newitt as Police Officer
 Daniel G. Albright as Policeman At Nightdesk
 Joe Camp as Newsstand Operator
 Don Reddy as Newsstand Customer
 Jeffrey Johnson as Hotel Desk Clerk
 Nanci Newman as Reporter
 Verne Lundquist as Radio Announcer
 Orson Welles as narrator
 Frank Inn as himself
 Benjean as Benji

Production
Joe Camp had a huge financial success with the film Benji, which made over $30 million on a budget of $545,000. In 1975 he announced he wanted to make The Double McGuffin as his second feature. The following year he said he would make it after Hawmps! (1976) and For the Love of Benji (1977). Camp called it a "combination of Hitchcock, The Sting and Mission Impossible set in a boarding school."

The film was shot in Charleston in January 1978.

References

External links

 

1970s mystery thriller films
1979 films
American mystery thriller films
Films directed by Joe Camp
Films scored by Euel Box
Films shot in Savannah, Georgia
1970s English-language films
1970s American films